Lankapalli is a village in the state of Andhra Pradesh in India, is in the Krishna district, Ghantasala Mandal, near Challapalli.

References 

Villages in Krishna district